Irène Debrunner (born 14 October 1952) is a Swiss former freestyle swimmer. She competed in the women's 4 × 100 metre freestyle relay at the 1972 Summer Olympics.

References

External links
 

1952 births
Living people
Olympic swimmers of Switzerland
Swimmers at the 1972 Summer Olympics
Place of birth missing (living people)
Swiss female freestyle swimmers
20th-century Swiss women